"I'm Leaving" is a song written by Aaron Barker, Ron Harbin and L. David Lewis, and recorded by American country music artist Aaron Tippin.  It was released in January 1999 as the second single from the album What This Country Needs.  The song reached number 17 on the Billboard Hot Country Singles & Tracks chart and number 87 on the Billboard 100. It also reached number 37 on the Canadian Country chart.

Chart performance

References

1999 singles
1998 songs
Aaron Tippin songs
Lyric Street Records singles
Songs written by Ron Harbin
Songs written by Aaron Barker